Aisonia is a former municipality in Magnesia, Thessaly, Greece. Since the 2011 local government reform it is part of the municipality Volos, of which it is a municipal unit. The municipal unit has an area of 75.504 km2. Population 3,249 (2011). The seat of the municipality was in Dimini.

Subdivisions
The municipal unit Aisonia is subdivided into the following communities (constituent villages in brackets):
Dimini (Dimini, Kakkavos, Paliouri)
Sesklo (Sesklo, Chrysi Akti Panagias)

Population

References

External links
 Aisonia on GTP Travel Pages

Populated places in Magnesia (regional unit)